Heka may refer to:
 Heka (god), the deification of magic in Egyptian mythology
 Lambda Orionis, a star in the constellation of Orion, also known by the traditional names "Meissa" and "Heka"
 Phenom II, core name for a triple-core in the Phenom II CPU-line from AMD